Kazeem Olaigbe (born 2 January 2003) is a Belgian professional footballer who plays as a winger for Harrogate Town on loan from Premier League club Southampton. He has represented Belgium at youth international level.

Club career 
Olaigbe began his career with Anderlecht before joining Southampton in the summer of 2019.

On 15 February 2022, Olaigbe signed a contract extension with Southampton until June 2024.

On 27 June 2022, Olaigbe joined Ross County on a season-long loan. On 16 July 2022, Olaigbe made his first professional appearance for Ross County in the Scottish League Cup in their 1–1 (3–4 pens) victory against Buckie Thistle, coming on as a substitute to replace Owura Edwards in the 66th minute. Ten days later, Olaigbe started his first professional match for the club in a 2–0 win against Alloa Athletic in the Scottish League Cup, and provided an assist for Josh Sims. Olaigbe returned to his parent club on 31 January 2023. Later that day, he joined League Two side Harrogate Town on loan until the end of the season.

International career 
Olaigbe has represented Belgium at under-17 and under-19 levels.

Career statistics

Club

References

External links 
Profile at Southampton F.C. website

Living people
2003 births
Belgian footballers
Belgium youth international footballers
Black Belgian sportspeople
Southampton F.C. players
Ross County F.C. players
Association football midfielders
Belgian expatriate footballers
Belgian expatriate sportspeople in England
Expatriate footballers in England
Belgian expatriate sportspeople in Scotland
Expatriate footballers in Scotland
Scottish Professional Football League players
Harrogate Town A.F.C. players